Romulus Hunt: A Family Opera is an album written and composed by American singer-songwriter Carly Simon, released by Angel Records, on November 16, 1993. 

The singing on the album is performed by a cast of five. Simon does appear at the end of the album, performing "Voulez-Vous Danser" as a bonus track.

History
Simon was jointly commissioned by the Metropolitan Opera Association and the Kennedy Center to write a contemporary opera that would appeal to younger people. She came up with Romulus Hunt, named after its 12-year-old protagonist. It is a family opera about divorce. Romulus tries to trick his divorced, ill-matched parents into coming back together. His sidekick is an imaginary Rastafarian named Zoogy who knows enough Jamaican magic to help with the plot. Eddie, Rom's father, is an artsy type who pierces his son's nose, while his prim mother, Joanna, worries more about propriety. A triangle is created by Mica, Eddie's girlfriend, a ditsy performance artist. During the show's final minutes Eddie learns to love Rom by recalling his own father's indifference.

Revival
In December 2014, the Nashville Opera Association premiered a new performance edition of the opera.

Track listing
All tracks are written by Carly Simon.

Credits

References

External links
 Carly Simon's Official Website

1993 albums
Carly Simon albums
Albums produced by Frank Filipetti
Albums recorded at MSR Studios